The Eddy County Courthouse in New Rockford, North Dakota was built during 1899–1900. 
Designed by M.E. Beebe, the building is architecturally significant as "an
outstanding example to the community of monumental public architecture".  At the time of its National Register nomination in 1985, it was in "pristine condition".

It was listed on the National Register of Historic Places in 1985.

References

Courthouses on the National Register of Historic Places in North Dakota
County courthouses in North Dakota
Government buildings completed in 1900
National Register of Historic Places in Eddy County, North Dakota
1900 establishments in North Dakota